Primitive Son is the sixth album by Virginia-based blues rock artist, Eli Cook. It was released in April 2014. The album leans more to the grunge/hard rock side of Cook's work, and features a slew of guest musicians such as Leslie West and Vinny Appice.

Critical reception
The critical response has been positive. Emma Johnston from Louder stated that the album contained "Timeless stuff created by a scholar of the genre". Steve Yourglivch from Blues Matters noted, "There is a high standard of songwriting and musicianship throughout. The guests never overshadow Eli and his core band but add subtleties and nuances."

Personnel
Eli Cook – Vocals, Guitar, Bass, Producer
Rob Richmond – Bass
Wade Warfield – Drums, Percussion
Leslie West – Featured Artist, Guitars
Vinny Appice – Featured Artist, Drums
Artimus Pyle – Featured Artist, Drums
Sonny Landreth – Featured Artist, Slide Guitar
Reese Wynans – Featured Artist, Hammond B3
Pat Travers – Featured Artist, Guitars, Vocals
Tinsley Ellis – Featured Artist, Guitar
Rod Piazza – Featured Artist, Harmonica
Eric Gales – Featured Artist, Guitar
Harvey Mandel – Featured Artist, Guitar
Jörgen Carlsson – Featured Artist, Bass
Erin Lunsford -Vocals
Anthony Focx – Mastering
Brian Craddock- Drum Engineering, Guitar Engineer, Vocal Engineer
Greg Hampton – Engineer, Mixing, Producer
Damani Harrison -Vocal Engineer
Chris Kress – Mixing
Jared Kvitka – Drum Engineering
Jeremy McKenzie – Engineer, Mixing
Music Resource Center – Vocal Engineer
Brian Perera – Executive Producer
Aliyah Davis – Graphic Design
M. De Vena – Cover Illustration

Track listing
All songs written by Eli Cook, except where noted.

External links
War Horse
Sweet Thang

References

2014 albums